Bukreyevka is a rural locality in Kamyshinsky Selsoviet Rural Settlement, Kursky District, Kursk Oblast, Russia. Population:

Geography 
The village is located 103 km from the Russia–Ukraine border, 6 km north-east of the district center – the town Kursk, 4 km from the selsoviet center – Kamyshi.

 Streets
There are the following streets in the locality: Lugovaya, Rodnikovaya, tupik Rodnikovy, Sirenevaya, Solnechnaya, Shirokaya, Vasilkovaya and Zelyonaya (483 houses).

 Climate
Bukreyevka has a warm-summer humid continental climate (Dfb in the Köppen climate classification).

Transport 
Bukreyevka is located 9 km from the federal route  Crimea Highway (a part of the European route ), on the road of regional importance  (Kursk – Ponyri), on the road of intermunicipal significance  (38K-018 – Churilovo), in the vicinity of the railway halt 521 km (railway line Oryol – Kursk).

The rural locality is situated 10 km from Kursk Vostochny Airport, 133 km from Belgorod International Airport and 205 km from Voronezh Peter the Great Airport.

References

Notes

Sources

Rural localities in Kursky District, Kursk Oblast